"Wish Tree" ( lit. Three Wishes) is a song recorded by South Korean girl group Red Velvet. It was released as the second single from their collaborative compilation album Winter Garden with f(x) and BoA on December 18, 2015. The song is "a pop ballad with a warm feel and an acoustic sound". It debuted and peaked at number thirty-three on the Gaon Digital Chart.

Background and composition
On December 4, 2015 SM Entertainment announced a winter single project titled Winter Garden. Three teaser images with the number '15', '18' and '22' were released all of which were the release dates of the singles. On December 7, Red Velvet was confirmed to be part of the project and their song was released on December 18.

The song is composed in F major and has a tempo of 114 bpm and has a running time of 3 minutes and 58 seconds."Wish Tree" is "a pop ballad with a warm feel and an acoustic sound".

Promotion and reception
To promote the song, Seulgi & Wendy took part in a one-hour show which was broadcast on the Naver V app an hour before the song'srelease. They were joined by f(x)'s Amber & Luna and they all discussed their groups' activities in the past year and promoted the singles The group as a whole performed the song live for the first time on Music Bank on December 25.

The song debuted at number 33 on the 52nd weekly issue of South Korea's Gaon Digital Chart for 2015 during the period dated December 13–19.

Track listing 
Digital download / streaming

 "Wish Tree"3:18

Credits and personnel 
Credits adapted from Melon.

 Red Velvet (Irene, Seulgi, Wendy, Joy, Yeri)vocals
 January 8Korean songwriting
 Matthew Tishlercomposition
 Felicia Bartoncomposition
 Aaron Benwardcomposition
 Hwang Chan-heearrangement
 Cheerful Playerarrangement
 Park In-youngstrings arrangement, conductor

Charts

Sales

Release history

References

2010s ballads
2015 singles
2015 songs
Pop ballads
Red Velvet (group) songs
Christmas songs